António Dias de Oliveira (20 July 1804, Valongo - 1 April 1863) was the President of the Council of Ministers of the Kingdom of Portugal from 2 June to 10 August 1837.

References

1804 births
1863 deaths
People from Valongo
Prime Ministers of Portugal
19th-century Portuguese people